Ramón Villeda Morales is a municipality in the Honduran department of Gracias a Dios.
It was named after a Former President Ramon Villeda Morales

Demographics
At the time of the 2013 Honduras census, Ramón Villeda Morales municipality had a population of 10,314. Of these, 87.90% were Indigenous (87.78% Miskito), 11.69% Mestizo, 0.21% Afro-Honduran or Black, 0.11% White and 0.09% others.

References

Municipalities of the Gracias a Dios Department